Super Typhoon Joan, known in the Philippines as  Typhoon Sening, was the first of two super typhoons to strike the Philippines within a week in October 1970, the second being Super Typhoon Kate. Super Typhoon Joan is the fourth strongest typhoon ever to affect the Philippines, just after typhoons Haiyan, Meranti, and Goni.

Meteorological history

A tropical disturbance was first detected on October 8 near Truk (now Chuuk) and Ponape (now Pohnpei). Due to the wind and sea conditions, the disturbance moved west quicker than expected at near 17 knots (31 km/h or 20 mph). A circulation developed on the morning of October 9, and it was a tropical storm by the time it passed Ulithi Atoll.

Joan continued to strengthen, and by October 11 had become a typhoon. However, it had slowed in forward speed due to it moving near an anticyclone that was located 300 miles (480 km) southeast of Okinawa. As Joan continued to strengthen, it reacted to the ridge line, and turned to the northwest, aiming the storm straight at Bicol Region and specifically Bicol Peninsula of Luzon.

An aerial reconnaissance crew (similar to Hurricane Hunters) sent to investigate Joan on October 13 encountered severe turbulence and a g-force reading of 2.5 gs as the storm was at its peak. The readings sent back put Joan with 150 knot (280 km/h or 175 mph) winds and a minimum central pressure of 905 mb.

The storm made landfall near noon the same day in the Lagonoy Gulf region of Luzon, but not before it had threatened and brushed the coast of Catanduanes Island. Bicol and Tagalog Provinces were affected as the storm continued to move across Luzon, losing strength. On October 14, the storm passed within 20 miles (32 km) of Manila.

Joan then entered the South China Sea. However, its path over Luzon had caused it to lose organisation around the vertical structure of the central eye region of Joan. Over October 14 and 15, the area of gale-force (tropical storm-force) winds grew to a - (400 km) radius from its centre. Its eye diameter also grew to 80 miles (130 km) - double the average eye diameter. This area filled almost the whole northern South China Sea and made Joan the largest storm of the season in size.

A trough over central China interacted with the ridge line and made Joan turned more northerly, and the storm took aim at the northeastern tip of Hainan Island on October 17. It made landfall on the Luichow Peninsula as a minimal typhoon and dissipated over southern China on October 18.

Impact
A United States Coast Guard LORAN station on Catanduanes, 30 miles (50 km) north of where the centre of the storm passed, recorded a windspeed of 90 knots (165 km/h or 105 mph) gusting to 110 knots (205 km/h or 130 mph).

Typhoon Joan made a direct hit on Naga City, where many people died from flying debris, collapsing homes, falling trees and floods. By doing so, the storm became the most intense storm ever of the Bicol Region.

Manila International Airport reported a peak gust of 84 knots (156 km/h or 97 mph) and a minimum pressure reading of 976.9 mb, while a U.S. Coast Guard ship, the USCGC Blackhaw anchored in Manila Bay reported a  gust.

The storm caused damage bad enough to rank high as some of the most destructive figures ever. Joan left over 80,000 people homeless, in addition to killing 575 people (193 people were unaccounted for, and have since been declared dead, bringing the total toll to 768) and injuring nearly 1600. US$74 million (1970 USD, $373 million 2005 USD) of damage was estimated, along with a 92% loss of agricultural crop in the regions affected. Later that same week, Super Typhoon Kate devastated the Philippines, making conditions worse.

In the South China Sea, shipping traffic was disrupted and USS Agerholm was reportedly in distress for almost 24 hours. However, there is a lack of information about damage and deaths in China.

See also

 List of tropical cyclones
 1970 Pacific typhoon season

References

1970 Pacific typhoon season
Typhoons in the Philippines
Typhoons in China
Typhoon Joan
Typhoon Joan
Typhoons
Retired Philippine typhoon names
1970 disasters in Asia